The Bouvier Affair was a number of international lawsuits that started in 2015, and subsequent events. The lawsuits allege that Swiss art shipper and dealer Yves Bouvier defrauded his clients by misrepresenting the original cost of art works and subsequently overcharging them. The affair has played out in courts in Monaco, Switzerland, France, the US, Hong Kong and Singapore.  

The alleged victims are "high net worth individuals" in the UK, the US, Asia and Europe, most notably Monaco-based Russian oligarch Dmitry Rybolovlev.

, Bouvier was facing criminal charges in France, Monaco and also in Switzerland after the Geneva Prosecutor opened a new case there.

Background

Prior fraud allegations 
Before 2015, Bouvier was primarily known in the market as an art transporter and curator through his company, Natural Le Coultre, and as a major shareholder and promoter of the freeport concept.

Lorette Shefner 
In 2008, Bouvier became embroiled in a legal case involving Lorette Shefner, a Canadian collector. Shefner's family claims that she was the victim of a complex fraud, whereby she was persuaded to sell a Soutine painting called Le Bœuf écorché  at a price far below market value, only to see the work later sold to the National Gallery of Art in Washington, D.C. for a much higher price. Although Bouvier is not the primary defendant, court documents from 2013 accuse him of having acted "in concert" with several experts "to disguise the true ownership" of pieces of art in order to defraud the Shefner estate.

Wolfgang Beltracchi forgery scandal 
In 2013, it was revealed that Bouvier was implicated in the notorious case of Wolfgang Beltracchi, a German forger who was convicted in 2011 of having defrauded a number of collectors, including Daniel Filipacchi, of millions of dollars. According to German newspaper Die Zeit, Bouvier founded Galerie Jacques de la Béraudière in 2008 together with art dealer Jacques de la Béraudière, who played a key role in the Beltracchi scandal. This and his ownership of an off-shore entity called Diva Fine Arts led to Bouvier also being connected to the Beltracchi case. He denied any connection to Beltracchi and dismissed media coverage as uninformed speculation.

Catherine Hutin-Blay 
In March 2015, Catherine Hutin-Blay, the step daughter of Pablo Picasso from his second wife Jacqueline, filed a complaint alleging that 58 separate works had been stolen from her. Hutin-Blay alleged that the works were stolen from a store in a suburb of Paris that is run by Art Transit, a Bouvier family company. It later emerged that Bouvier had sold two of the allegedly stolen Picasso paintings to Rybolovlev in 2013. Rybolovlev handed over the paintings to French authorities in 2015.

Bouvier denied any involvement in the thefts, but in September 2015 he was indicted by French authorities on charges of theft in relation to the discovery of two of the works by Picasso that Hutin-Blay alleged were stolen from her. In court, Bouvier produced a document showing that he paid $8 million to a fund in Liechtenstein, of which Hutin-Blay was the beneficiary, and asserted that this was for the two paintings. Hutin-Blay has disputed this, arguing that the payment concerned a matter unrelated to the thefts.

Following several rounds of interviews with lawyers in Geneva, the case was dismissed in 2015, but reopened in 2016 as Bouvier's associate Olivier Thomas came under renewed scrutiny.

Allegations of money laundering 
In late 2015, it emerged that Bouvier has been investigated by the authorities in Liechtenstein on suspicion of money laundering, in one instance related to a forged Max Ernst work, that is alleged to have been created by Wolfgang Beltracchi. However, Liechtenstein suspended its investigation in December 2015.

In September 2017, Bouvier was under criminal investigation by Swiss authorities amid allegations that he may have evaded more than 100 million Euros in taxes related to his cross-border art dealings.

Case 
The Hutin-Blay case coincided with a separate case involving allegations made by Rybolovlev that forms the main part of the Yves Bouvier Affair. With the help of Yves Bouvier, Dmitry Rybolovlev accumulated one of the most spectacular art collections of modern times since 2003. Rybolovlev's art collection includes paintings by Paul Gauguin, Auguste Rodin, Amedeo Modigliani (Nude on a Blue Cushion), Pablo Picasso, Henri Matisse, and Mark Rothko (No. 6). In addition to these seminal works, Rybolovlev also purchased the painting Wasserschlangen II (or Water Serpents), by Gustav Klimt, though it was subsequently sold.

Monaco

Arrest 
On 25 February 2015, Bouvier was indicted in Monaco on charges of fraud and complicity in money laundering. The charges followed a criminal complaint made by Rybolovlev's family trust alleging that Bouvier had systematically overcharged it over a period of 10 years to acquire paintings. Specifically, the Russian billionaire's lawyers accused Bouvier of having misrepresented his role in obtaining 38 artworks for $2 billion and having thus defrauded Rybolovlev to the tune of a little more than $1 billion, using offshore companies to disguise his gains.

Subsequent developments 
After HSBC Monaco provided a letter during the police investigation that erroneously stated that Bouvier and a co-defendant, Tania Rappo, with whom he is accused to have conspired to launder money from his art deal proceeds, held joint accounts at the bank, Bouvier called for an investigation into that matter. HSBC stated the error was "unintentional and clerical."

Allegations occurred in the French and Swiss press that Rybolovlev received help in arresting Bouvier from Monaco's justice minister, Philippe Narmino, and Monaco's principal prosecutor from 2011 to 2015 and former prosecutor at Perpignan, Sables d'Olonne, Papeete and Pau, Jean-Pierre Dreno. On that basis, Bouvier and Rappo attempted to have the charges against them thrown out in November 2015, arguing that there were a number of irregularities in the legal procedure against them and that Rybolovlev may have exercised undue influence. However, the judge rejected their argument. Criminal proceedings are ongoing .

On 1 October 2015, Monaco's new principal prosecutor Jacques Dorémieux replaced Jean-Pierre Dreno who gained judicial responsibilities at Aix-en-Provence and had been implicated in a suspicious purchase of an apartment at Ospedaletti on the Italian Riviera from Silvio Berlusconi's 85 year old brother, who lives in the Netherlands, through the intermediary Erminio Giraudi. With the release of the Panama Papers on 3 April 2016, the minister of justice Phillippe Narmino's son Antoine Narmino through the son's consultancy firm Narmino & Dotta was shown to have established 29 overseas companies registered in Panama with support from Mossack Fonseca. In August and September 2017, Mediapart published articles which showed a close relationship between Dmitry Rybololev and Phillippe Narmino. On 8 November 2018, Dmitri Rybolovlev and Philippe Narmino were charged in Monaco court with passive and active influence peddling and for passive corruption.

On 12 December, 2019, Monaco’s Court of Appeal dismissed the charges of fraud and money laundering against Bouvier. Legal proceedings continue in other jurisdictions, including Switzerland. The Geneva public prosecutor's office is also in possession of emails exchanged between Bouvier and Sotheby's, while the former was making private purchases for Dmitry Rybolovlev.

Singapore 
On 12 March 2015, Rybolovlev sued Bouvier in Singapore, asking for a global freeze on Bouvier's and Rappo's assets. On 13 March, Senior Judge Lai Siu Chiu of the High Court of Singapore ordered the global freezing of Bouvier's assets. The Singapore Court of Appeal repealed the decision and ordered that Bouvier's assets be unfrozen, citing a low risk that Bouvier would dissipate his assets and that Rybolovlev failed to follow procedure in the injunction by not giving Bouvier notice of the proceedings.

In March 2016, the High Court of Singapore dismissed Bouvier's attempt to suspend the civil suit filed in the territory against him by two companies linked to the Rybolovlev family trust. Bouvier had argued the dispute should be fought in the Swiss courts. In a judgment published on 22 March 2016, Senior Judge Lai Siu Chiu ruled that the Singapore suit, which was filed in the High Court in 2015, should proceed. She said the case should be transferred to the Singapore International Commercial Court, which deals specifically with cross-border commercial disputes.

On 18 April 2017, the Court of Appeal of Singapore again contradicted the High Court, ruling that Switzerland was a more appropriate forum for the civil lawsuit.

Hong Kong 
Next to Singapore, Bouvier also had the assets of his Hong Kong-based company Mei Invest Limited frozen through an injunction in July 2015. In September that year, it was announced that a consent summons had been agreed upon between Bouvier and Accent Delight International Limited as well as Xitrans Finance Limited, two of Rybolovlev's companies. Subsequently, Bouvier's assets were unfrozen.

United States 

In New York, auction house Sotheby's got embroiled in the legal dispute in 2016 when the art dealers that had originally sold Da Vinci's Salvator Mundi painting to Bouvier, learned that he had sold it to Rybolovlev at a much higher price. According to court papers, Sotheby's was asked to clarify whether it had been aware that the painting was worth more than what the art dealers had sold it to Bouvier for, and whether the auction house had misled the dealers in favor of the Swiss trader. Email exchanges unearthed by Rybolovlev’s lawyers indicate that the practice of over-invoicing was systematic, with the intermediary regularly pushing his client to buy paintings without giving them the necessary reflection time for such investments.

In November that year, Sotheby's issued a pre-emptive suit in relation to Salvator Mundi, denying that it had ever been part of a scheme allegedly perpetrated by Bouvier to defraud both the sellers of the painting, and Rybolovlev.

On 11 June 2018, the United States District Court for the Southern District of New York granted Rybolovlev permission to access Sotheby's paperwork regarding its interactions with Bouvier for his ongoing lawsuits against the Swiss in Monaco and Switzerland.

Another ongoing US investigation into Bouvier and his alleged involvement in fraudulent activities was dropped in May 2018.

On 2 October 2018, Rybolovlev sued Sotheby's for $380 million, alleging the auction house had "materially assisted the largest art fraud in history" and that Sotheby's "knowingly and intentionally made the fraud possible" because it was aware of how much Bouvier had paid the original sellers of the paintings later purchased by Rybolovlev. Sotheby's called these allegations "baseless" and told Reuters it would seek to have the lawsuit dismissed in a New York court.

In what Sotheby’s called a “disappointing” decision, a US federal court in Manhattan rejected Sotheby’s request to have the case dismissed. On 25 June 2019, the court argued that the auction house did not present evidence that would justify the “exceptional circumstances” required to have the case thrown out. Instead, Sotheby’s was ordered to submit previously confidential details relevant to the case for consideration and was banned from redacting information from court documents. 

A November 2019 ruling of a New York court compelled Sotheby’s to produce documents used in foreign criminal proceedings in the Affair in the jurisdictions of Switzerland and Monaco. Sotheby’s had fought against this decision, arguing that confidentiality and the fact that it was named in the Swiss proceedings should shield it from having to submit the documents, which the court rejected.

Impact 
The Bouvier Affair has been widely reported and followed across the art world and beyond as it laid bare "the exploitation of art for financial gain" and put a spotlight on the often business behaviors of middlemen in the art market. Furthermore, Bouvier’s alleged wrongdoings have led to policymakers’ greater scrutiny of his freeports, where high-dollar art is often stored.

Commentators have opined that the unfolding events could be the catalyst for a renewed push to reform the art sector.

References

Art crime
Fraud